Thelyphonidae is the sole family in the Uropygi order of arachnids.

Description
The body consists of a cephalothorax coated with chitin and of an abdomen divided into 12 segments.

Fossil record
The largest of prehistoric whipscorpions and possibly the largest-known whipscorpion ever discovered was Mesoproctus from this family.

Genera
Most genera are currently placed in four recognised subfamilies:

Hypoctoninae
Auth.: Pocock, 1899
Etienneus Heurtault, 1984
Hypoctonus Thorell, 1888
Labochirus Pocock, 1894
Thelyphonellus Pocock, 1894
Ravilops Viquez & de Armas, 2005

Mastigoproctinae
Auth.: Speijer, 1933

Mastigoproctus Pocock, 1894
Mayacentrum Viquez & de Armas, 2006
Mimoscorpius Pocock, 1894
Sheylayongium Teruel, 2018
Uroproctus Pocock, 1894
Valeriophonus Viquez & de Armas, 2005

Thelyphoninae
Auth.: Lucas, 1835

Abaliella Strand, 1928
Chajnus Speijer, 1936
Ginosigma Speijer, 1936
Glyptogluteus Rowland, 1973
Minbosius Speijer, 1936
Tetrabalius Thorell, 1888
Thelyphonoides - monotypic Thelyphonoides panayensis Krehenwinkel, Curio, Tacud & Haupt, 2009 
Thelyphonus Latreille, 1802
†Mesothelyphonus Cai and Huang, 2017 (Burmese amber, Cenomanian)

Typopeltinae
Auth.: Rowland & Cooke, 1973

Typopeltis Pocock, 1894

Incertae sedis
†Mesoproctus Dunlop, 1998 (Crato Formation, Aptian)

References

External links

Arachnid families
Uropygi